General elections were held in Nicaragua on 4 November 1984, to elect a president and parliament. Approximately 1.2 million Nicaraguans voted, representing a 75% turnout, with 94% of eligible voters registered. Impartial observers from international groupings such as the European Economic Community, religious groups sent to monitor the election, and observers from democratic nations such as Canada and the Republic of Ireland concluded that the elections were generally free and fair.

The election date, 4 November was selected so that Nicaragua would have a legitimate, elected government in place before the anticipated reelection of U.S. president Ronald Reagan on 6 November. "The Sandinistas hoped that a competitive election with heavy turnout would deter a U.S. military intervention and reassure the FSLN's defenders. So the Sandinistas' decision to hold elections in 1984 was largely of foreign inspiration".

Between 1982 and 1984 the FSLN negotiated with the opposition on the proposed Political Parties Law and Electoral Law, and ultimately these were modified "in response to several of the opposition's most significant demands." Similarly, multiple extensions of the deadline for candidate registration were granted whilst talks with the Coordinadora continued.

Coordinadora Democrática participation
It has been argued that "probably a key factor in preventing the 1984 elections from establishing liberal democratic rule was the United States' policy toward Nicaragua." The Reagan administration was divided over whether or not the rightwing coalition Coordinadora Democrática Nicaragüense should participate in the elections, which "only complicated the efforts of the Coordinadora to develop a coherent electoral strategy." Ultimately the US administration public and private support for non-participation allowed those members of the Coordinadora who favoured a boycott to gain the upper hand.

A coalition of right-wing parties including the Social Christians, Social Democrats, and the Constitutional Liberal Party, calling itself the 'Democratic Coordinating Committee' (Coordinadora), decided to abstain from the elections on the grounds that the opposition parties had been given insufficient 'guarantees,' and not enough time to prepare for the elections. The Coordinadora's abstentionism was publicly supported by the US government, which hoped to challenge the legitimacy of the November elections by alleging that opposition sectors were not able to participate. But despite US intervention and the Coordinadora abstention seven political parties took part in the November elections. The three center-right/right-wing parties which put forward candidates were the PCDN, PLI, and PPSC. The three opposing left-wing parties were the PSN, PC de N and MAPML."

Aftermath
The Reagan administration denounced the 1984 vote as a 'Soviet-style sham', despite contrary opinions from external observers such as Baron Chitnis, the Latin American Studies Association, and the international press. It escalated its diplomatic and propaganda campaign against the Sandinista government and increased military aid to the Contras. "This undercut the new regime's legitimacy abroad and frustrated its hopes that the 1984 vote might smooth the way at home." May 1985 saw a trade embargo imposed, followed by $27m of "non-lethal" aid to the Contras, supplemented by $37m of secret "lethal" aid. This led to the October 1985 reimposition of a State of Emergency in Nicaragua.

Results

President

National Assembly

References

Bibliography
 Alcántara Sáez, Manuel. Sistemas políticos de América Latina. Madrid: Tecnos. Two volumes. Volume two is "México. Los países del Caribe y de América Central." 1989.
 Alcántara Sáez, Manuel. Sistemas políticos de América Latina. Madrid: Tecnos. Two volumes. Volume two is "México, América Central y el Caribe." Largely rewritten and updated second edition. 1999.
 Anderson, Leslie. "Elections and public opinion in the development of Nicaraguan democracy." Seligson, Mitchell A. and John A. Booth. 1995. Elections and democracy in Central America, revisited. Chapel Hill: The University of North Carolina Press.
 Booth, John A. "Electoral observation and democratic transition in Nicaragua." Electoral observation and democratic transitions in Latin America. 1998. La Jolla: Center for U.S.-Mexican Studies, University of California, San Diego.
 Chomsky, Noam and Edward S. Herman (1988), Manufacturing Consent: The Political Economy of the Mass Media, New York: Pantheon Books - [Chapter 3 focusses on the US media coverage of the 1984 Nicaraguan elections]
 Close, David.  "The Nicaraguan elections of 1984." Electoral studies 4, 2:152-158 (August 1985).
 Close, David. Nicaragua : the Chamorro years. Boulder: Lynne Reinner. 1999.
 Cornelius, Wayne A. "The Nicaraguan elections of 1984: a reassessment of their domestic and international significance." Drake, Paul W. and Eduardo Silva. 1986. Elections and democratization in Latin America, 1980–85. La Jolla: Center for Iberian and Latin American Studies, Center for U.S.-Mexican Studies, Institute of the Americas, University of California, San Diego.
 Dunkerley, James. 1988. Power in the isthmus: a political history of Central America. London: Verso.
 Elections in the Americas A Data Handbook Volume 1. North America, Central America, and the Caribbean. Edited by Dieter Nohlen. 2005.
 Fiallos Oyanguren, Mariano. .
 Figueroa Ibarra, Carlos. "Centroamérica: entre la crisis y la esperanza (1978-1990)." Historia general de Centroamérica. 1994. San José: FLACSO. Volume six,
 Goodman, Louis W., ed. Political parties and democracy in Central America. Boulder: Westview Press. 1992.
 Hale, Charles R. "Institutional struggle, conflict and reconciliation: Miskitu Indians and the Nicaraguan state (1979-1985)." Ethnic groups and the nation state: the case of the Atlantic coast in Nicaragua. 1987. Stockholm: University of Stockholm, CIDCA.
 Horton, Lynn. Peasants in arms: war and peace in the mountains of Nicaragua, 1979–1994. Athens: Ohio University, Center for International Studies. 1998.
 Isbester, Katherine. Still fighting: the Nicaraguan women's movement, 1977–2000. Pittsburgh: University of Pittsburgh Press. 2001.
 Luciak, Ilja A. After the revolution: gender and democracy in El Salvador, Nicaragua, and Guatemala. Baltimore: Johns Hopkins University Press. (Also published as Después de la revolución. San Salvador: UCA Editores). 2001.
 Merrill, Tim L., ed. Nicaragua : a country study. Washington: Federal Research Division, Library of Congress. 1994.
 Ortega Hegg, Manuel. "Participación y democracia en Nicaragua." Pasos hacia una nueva convivencia: democracia y participación en Centroamérica. 2001. San Salvador: FUNDAUNGO.
 Payne, Douglas W. The 1996 Nicaragua elections: post-election report. Washington: Center for Strategic and International Studies. 1996.
 Political handbook of the world 1984. New York, 1985. 
 Ryan, David. US-Sandinista diplomatic relations: voice of intolerance . London: MacMillan Press Ltd. 1995.
 Smith, Hazel. Nicaragua: self-determination and survival. London : Pluto Press. 1993.
 Weaver, Eric and William Barnes. "Opposition parties and coalitions." Revolution and counterrevolution in Nicaragua. 1991. Boulder: Westview Press.
 Williams, Philip J. "Elections and democratization in Nicaragua: the 1990 elections in perspective." Journal of Interamerican Studies 32, 4:13-34 (winter 1990).
 Williams, Philip J. "Dual transitions from authoritarian rule: popular and electoral democracy in Nicaragua." Comparative politics 26, 2:169-185 (January 1994).

Nicaraguan Revolution
Elections in Nicaragua
1984 in Nicaragua
Nicaragua
Presidential elections in Nicaragua
Foreign electoral intervention
Nicaragua–United States relations